San Antonio is a 1945 American Western film starring Errol Flynn and Alexis Smith. The film was written by W. R. Burnett and Alan Le May, and directed in Technicolor by David Butler as well as uncredited Robert Florey and Raoul Walsh.

The film was nominated for 2 Academy Awards; for Best Original Song ("Some Sunday Morning") and Best Art Direction (Ted Smith, Jack McConaghy).

Plot
Rustlers are running rampant in Texas, but at least one rancher, Charlie Bell, isn't pulling up stakes yet, particularly with the news that old friend Clay Hardin is en route from Mexico back home to San Antonio.

Clay claims to have proof, documented in a book, that Roy Stuart is responsible for the rustling. Clay arrives in town by stagecoach, as does Jeanne Starr, who is taking a job as a singer in Stuart's saloon.

Lured backstage by Jeanne, suspicious that she could be in cahoots with her boss, Clay leaves the book in Charlie's care. But a partner of Stuart's, a man named Legare, wants the book for his own reasons, so he steals it and shoots Charlie.

The shooting is witnessed by the singer's manager, Sacha, but he is too fearful to speak out. There is no law in San Antonio, only a troop of soldiers about to pull out, so Clay temporarily takes the job of marshal.

Legare is chased into the Alamo's ruins by Stuart and is killed. Clay sets out in hot pursuit of Stuart, determined to arrest him, but ultimately Stuart is killed when he hits his head on a rock during the climactic fist-fight with Clay. Jeanne decides to leave San Antonio for good, but Clay persuades her to stay.

Cast

Production

Development
W.R. Burnett, one of the writers, said Warner Bros had the idea of getting Max Brand to write an Errol Flynn Western. Burnett says "They gave him carte blanche, which they never did, because of his enormous reputation. He used to come in every day with a briefcase and go out every night with a briefcase. We found out later he brought in two quarts of gin every day and drank them up-took the empties out."

Burnett says a few months later he got a call from Jim Geller, head of Warners story department, saying they had a shooting date, Flynn and a color commitment, but Brand had come up with "a very original idea for us. A Western in which there's no action." Geller told Burnett to come up with a story with producer Robert Buckner.

(According to a later article on Brand, the author contributed to the scripts of the Flynn films Uncertain Glory, The Adventures of Don Juan and Montana before becoming a war correspondent and being killed in May 1944.)

Burnett says he wrote the script in three weeks then rewrote it. He says he pitched Marlene Dietrich for Flynn's co star; Jack Warner was enthusiastic but did not want to pay Dietrich's fee especially when he had so many actors under contract.

In March 1944, Warners announced they would make the film from a script by Burnett with Raoul Walsh to direct. It was the third in a series of Westerns he made named after a city, following Dodge City and Virginia City.

In June it was announced that Raymond Massey, who had made Santa Fe Trail with Flynn, was going to play the second male lead. He was initially replaced by Zachary Scott, and Alexis Smith was selected as the female lead. By July David Butler had been assigned to direct and Paul Kelly, not Scott, was to play the villain.

Writer W.R. Burnett said when Butler was given the job of directing it "scared the hell out of us because he had never made anything but musicals. But he got a good picture out of it.

Shooting
Shooting started September 1944. The film was shot at Warners' Calabasas Ranch.

Director David Butler said Warners "built probably the longest street that was ever built for a Western at Warners" for the film and "they built it the wrong way."

Butler says he was warned about working with Flynn but "I never met a nicer man in my entire life. He did everything he was told." Butler says Flynn was only drunk once, for a close up, and was always on time.

Actor Hap Hogan died during filming.

"That was a fine, well done picture," said Butler. "We had a lot of fun and Flynn was great."

Reception

Box Office
The film was Flynn's most popular movie of the mid 1940s, earning $3,553,000 domestically and $2,346,000 foreign. It was Warners' third most popular film of the year, after Saratoga Trunk and Night and Day.

Critical
Filmink magazine argued "there is something anonymous about the film – none of the sequences reach the delirious excesses found in the Dodge City trilogy, for instance; it’s less silly than anything in those movies but also less memorable."

References

Sources

External links

 
 
 
 
 San Antonio at Letterbox DVD
 Film review at Variety

1945 films
1945 Western (genre) films
American Western (genre) films
Films directed by David Butler
Films directed by Raoul Walsh 
Films directed by Robert Florey 
Films scored by Ray Heindorf
Films scored by Max Steiner
Films scored by Erich Wolfgang Korngold 
Films set in 1877
Films set in San Antonio
Warner Bros. films
1940s English-language films
1940s American films